The Beverly Clock is a clock in the 3rd-floor lift foyer of the Department of Physics at the University of Otago, Dunedin, New Zealand. The clock is still running despite never having been manually wound since its construction in 1864 by Arthur Beverly.

Operation
The clock's mechanism is driven by variations in atmospheric pressure, and by daily temperature variations; of the two, temperature variations are more important. Either causes the air in a  airtight box to expand or contract, which pushes on a diaphragm.

A similar mechanism in a commercially available clock that operates on the same principle is the Atmos clock, manufactured by the Swiss watchmaker Jaeger-LeCoultre.

While the clock has not been wound since it was made, it has stopped on a number of occasions, such as when its mechanism needed cleaning or there was a mechanical failure, and when the Physics Department moved to new quarters.  Also, on occasions when the ambient temperature does not fluctuate sufficiently to supply the requisite amount of energy, the clock will not function. However, after environmental parameters readjust, the clock begins operating again.

See also
Long-term experiment
Oxford Electric Bell (1840)
Pitch drop experiment (1927)
Cox's timepiece
Clock of the Long Now
Atmos clock, a commercially available clock working on a similar principle
 Temperature gradient ocean glider

References
Citations

General 

History of physics
University of Otago
Clocks in New Zealand
1864 works